Twelve Cupcakes is a Singapore based chain of cupcakeries selling cupcakes. Owned by Dhunseri Group, the cupcakery was established in 2011 and is one of the largest in Singapore. The company established a new dine-in cafe, Dulce and Sucre, in 2014 and currently has 40 stores, in 2 countries, with 35 located in Singapore.

Name
The number '12' is significant in daily lives as there are 12 months in a year, 12 numbers on a clock and 12 holes in a typical baking tray. Hence the name Twelve Cupcakes.

History

In 2011, Daniel Ong and Jaime Teo started Twelve Cupcakes with Jaime having created the recipes of all the cupcakes sold in the stores. The cupcakes sold were made to suit to the Asian palate, which are less sweet compared to western cupcakes. The first outlet of Twelve Cupcakes was opened at United Square Shopping Mall, in Novena, which started with two service staff. The company then expanded and opened three more outlets during the first year of operations and sold over three million cupcakes in July 2011.

On 24 January 2017, after the divorce of Daniel Ong and Jaime Teo in late 2016, the chain was sold to Dhunseri Group, which acquired it for S$2.5 million.

Dulce and Sucre
In 2014, Twelve Cupcakes started a new dessert cafe known as Dulce and Sucre by Twelve Cupcakes, where it sells freshly baked loaves, whoopie pies, push up cakes, parfaits, puddings, tiramisus, crunchies, coffees and other desserts. Currently there is only one outlet located at Orchard Gateway. It converted to a Twelve Cupcakes outlet in 2015.

Products and stores
Twelve Cupcakes features 60 flavours of cupcakes sold in its stores, with a standard '12 Everyday Flavours' and 50 specials sold on a rotational basis. A new flavour of cupcake is also launched monthly. Twelve Cupcakes new dine-in cafe outlet, Dulce and Sucre, offers a wider variety of menu items, with coffees, whoopie pies, push up cakes, parfaits and other baked items.

The stores originally started with display counters made of wood and feature brick wall, but has since re-designed the interiors of newer outlets with a more modern glass display casing as well as a glossy feature wall. The chain cupcakery currently has 40 stores located in 2 locations with 5 in Hong Kong and 35 in Singapore.

Twelve Cupcakes introduced the popular Honey Cakes in November 2015 and brownies in July 2016.

Controversy

Singapore Press Holdings
In 2012, Singapore Press Holdings (SPH) demanded payment from the cupcakery for reproducing its articles online. The cupcakery put up articles written about their business on Facebook, Twitter and the company's website, which infringes the copyright of SPH and violates copyright law in Singapore.

Underpayment of foreign staff
Twelve Cupcakes was accused of underpaying its foreign workers between 2017 and 2019 by the Ministry of Manpower. When the workers were supposed to be paid salaries ranging from $2,200 to $2,600, the actual salaries paid were lower at $1,400 to $2,050. Initially, the salaries were paid in reduced amounts, before changing tactics to pay the actual salaries with a portion needing to be returned to the company. Twelve Cupcakes was first charged for its offences on 1 October 2020, before pleading guilty on 10 December. Twelve Cupcakes was fined $119,500 on 12 January 2021 for its offences.

Separately on 29 December 2020, co-founders Daniel Ong and Jaime Teo were charged for offences related to underpayment and non-payment of salaries between 2012 and 2016. Teo pleaded guilty on 4 February 2021, and was fined $65,000 on 9 March. Ong was fined a similar amount on 21 May. In addition, former director Yvonne Ong was fined $20,000 for allowing underpayment of the company's workers in 2013 and 2014.

Due to these instances of underpayment, the Food, Drinks and Allied Workers Union (a union affiliated to National Trades Union Congress) announced on 16 February 2021 plans to unionise the company to make sure workers are fairly represented and to work with the company's management on better employment practices. These plans were being set out as early as late 2020 with the management and employees of the company informed. The company was successfully unionised 10 days later with a secret ballot by the Ministry of Manpower, with majority of the workers voting overwhelmingly for the arrangement.

References

External links
Official website
Dulce and Sucre official website

2011 establishments in Singapore
Singaporean companies established in 2011
Bakeries of Singapore
Food and drink companies of Singapore
Singaporean brands